Mystery Date is a 1991 American dark comedy film directed by Jonathan Wacks and starring Ethan Hawke, Teri Polo, and Brian McNamara.  Shock-rockers Gwar have a brief cameo in the film.

Plot
Tom McHugh quickly learns that his perfect big brother Craig isn't all he's cracked up to be while on a night on the town with the girl next door, during which Tom is harassed by unpleasant strangers, threatened by mobsters, pursued by police, attacked by an irate florist, accused of murder, and has his date kidnapped—all because everyone thinks he's Craig...and the classic 1959 DeSoto Firesweep he borrowed off his brother has two dead bodies in the trunk.

Cast
Ethan Hawke as Tom McHugh
Teri Polo as Geena Matthews
Brian McNamara as Craig McHugh
Fisher Stevens as Dwight
BD Wong as James Lew
Tony Rosato as Sharpie
Don S. Davis as Doheny
James Hong as Fortune Teller
Victor Wong as Janitor
Ping Wu as Vince
Duncan Fraser as Crully
Jerry Wasserman as Detective Al Condon
Terry David Mulligan as Mr. McHugh
Merrilyn Gann as Mrs. McHugh
Stephen Chang as Ben
Russell Jung as Jerry
Michele Little as Stella
Allan Lysell as Mr. Lusky
Donna Lysell as Mrs. Lusky
Keith Beardwood as Mr. Culp
Sharlene Martin as Suzette
Celia Martin as Sandy
Ian Black as Limo Driver
Karen Campbell as Suzy
Sean Orr as Aldo
Dave 'Squatch' Ward as Earl
Peter Williams as Bartender
Constance Barnes as Bonna
Todd Duckworth as Motorcycle Cop

Reception
Mystery Date holds a 25% approval rating on Rotten Tomatoes based on eight reviews; the average rating is 4.7/10.

Desson Howe from The Washington Post wrote: "Mystery Date is an exclamation point movie. Built on nothing but zany high points, it survives entirely on plot surprise.  Maybe this kind of Date is for you! But guess what! I'd rather be at the pub!"

References

External links
 
 

1991 films
1991 romantic comedy films
1990s teen comedy films
1990s teen romance films
American romantic comedy films
American teen comedy films
American teen romance films
Films scored by John Du Prez
Films shot in Vancouver
1990s English-language films
1990s American films